is a former Japanese football player.

Club statistics

References

External links

1988 births
Living people
Association football people from Osaka Prefecture
Japanese footballers
J2 League players
Japan Football League players
Ehime FC players
V-Varen Nagasaki players
Kamatamare Sanuki players
SP Kyoto FC players
Association football defenders